André Doehring (born in 1973) is a German musicologist, who is active in pop music and jazz research.

Work 
Born in Uelzen, Doehring studied musicology and sociology. Since 2005 he worked as a research assistant at the Institute for Musicology and Music Pedagogy at the University of Gießen, where he earned his doctorate in 2010 with a thesis on pop music journalism. After a teaching assignment in Vienna, he was appointed professor for jazz and popular music research at the University of Music and Performing Arts Graz in 2016. There he heads the Institute for Jazz Research. His research interests include topics in popular music, sociomusicology and musical analysis.

He is co-editor of samples.de and from 2017 of the two series published in Graz Beiträge zur Jazzforschung / Studies In Jazz Research as well as Jazzforschung / Jazz Research.

Publications 
 Musikkommunikatoren: Berufsrollen, Organisationsstrukturen und Handlungsspielräume im Popmusikjournalismus Bielefeld: Transcript Verlag 2011; 
 Ralf von Appen, André Doehring, Dietrich Helms, Allan F. Moore (edits.) Song Interpretation in 21st-Century Pop Music. London, New York: Routledge 2015; 
 Ralf von Appen / André Doehring (edits.) Pop weiter denken: Neue Anstöße aus Jazz Studies, Philosophie, Musiktheorie und Geschichte. Bielefeld: Transcript Verlag 2018; 
 The Shape of Jazz Studies to Come? Überlegungen zu Anforderungen, Inhalten und Zielen der Ausbildung von JazzforscherInnen. In , Wolf-Georg Zaddach (edit.): Jazzforschung heute. Themen, Methoden, Perspektiven. Berlin: Edition Emvas 2019,

References

External links 
 
 Entry (KUG)
 André Doehring: Populismus und Pop-Musik (Vortrag)
 Interview zum Verhältnis von Jazz- und Popmusikforschung

21st-century German musicologists
1973 births
Living people
People from Uelzen
University of Giessen alumni
Academic staff of the University of Music and Performing Arts Graz